is a Japanese professional baseball player for the Hiroshima Toyo Carp of Nippon Professional Baseball (NPB).

On February 27, 2019, he was selected for Japan national baseball team at the 2019 exhibition games against Mexico.

References

External links

 NPB.com

1993 births
Living people
Hiroshima Toyo Carp players
Japanese baseball players
Nippon Professional Baseball outfielders
Baseball people from Hyōgo Prefecture
Chubu Gakuin University alumni
People from Miki, Hyōgo